Asmita Marwa is an Indian fashion designer, rated by Vogue as one of nine top up-and-coming international designers. Asmita Marwa believes in fusing the traditional with the global. Her eclectic and vibrant avatar of Kalamkari took the fashion world by storm.

Asmita Marwa's fashion label is sustainable, and the garments are created and manufactured using ethical norms and practices.

Design career
Marwa began designing clothes in Hyderabad in the 1990s. She was the first Hyderabad designer to enter the Telugu film industry. Numerous actors, including Nagarjuna, Balakrishna, Preity Zinta, Anjala Zaveri, Shriya, Mahesh Babu, Tabu, Asin, Charmy, and Anushka, have worn her clothes, in films like Manmadhudu, Santhosham, Premante Idera, Arjun, Attadu, Pokiri, and Gharshana.

In December 2003 Marwa launched a fashion label, Asmita, sold through her signature store Reves d’Etoile and at "xlnc" in Hyderabad and "Aza Fashions" in Mumbai and Delhi. Marwa's designs for Asmita featured in the Blenders Pride Fashion Fringe Show in 2004. In 2008 she took part in the Lakme Fashion Week. 

Lakme Fashion Week:

March/April; 2008
The collection "Gaia-An Awakening"

Fall Winter March 2009
'Maya and her Jaggery Knots' was Asmita Marwa's third collection, which combined diverse elements like Khadi, Antique Banaras, Tartan Checks, Telugu Calligraphy and giant roses.

Style journalism
For many years Marwah wrote a style column in the Hyderabad Times

Personal life
Marwah is married and has a son. She has also participated in the Blenders Pride Fashion tour, the goa beach fashion week and is a member of the fashion council of India.

References

Indian women fashion designers
Businesspeople from Hyderabad, India
Living people
Year of birth missing (living people)